Michael Simpson (born 1940) is a British painter. Simpson has had major solo shows at the Serpentine (1985), the Arnolfini (1996), Spike Island (2016), and BlainSouthern (2017), and in 2016 won the John Moores Painting Prize for his painting Squint (19).

Career
Born in Dorset of Anglo-Russian parents, he attended Bournemouth College of Art (1958–60) and the Royal College of Art (1960–63). Simpson makes large scale paintings in ongoing series. These often repeat and rework a number of subjects and elements. Simpson's influences includes early Flemish painting, and his painting style incorporates minimalism and other types of formal restraints. He describes his approach to painting as a "deceptive force of the constructed image."

In Vitamin P3, a guide to contemporary painting, critic Barry Schwabsky described Simpson’s ‘allegiance to a conception more readily associated with abstraction than with painting that employs images’. He goes on to describe the artist’s preoccupation with “the idea that painting is not a kind of imaginary opening in the wall through which we get an illusory view of another world, but rather a physical thing that is made, whose flat surface confronts the viewer with a presence that demands engagement.”
 
Simpson has served as lecturer in several British Art Schools and Universities, and has been featured in various documentaries including "Odyssey of a Painter" (Louisiana Channel Documentary). He currently lives and works in Bradford on Avon, Wiltshire.

National collections
 Tate (London, England)
 Louisiana Museum of Modern Art (Copenhagen)
 British Council (England)
 Arts Council (England)
 David Roberts Collection (London)
 Ekard Collection (Netherlands)

Awards
 John Moores (2016)
 Winner of the London Arts Foundation Fellowship (1999)
 John Moores 17 (1991)
 Tolly Cobbald Open (1977)

External links 
 Michael Simpson homepage
 Michael Simpson at David Risley Gallery
 Michael Simpson at Blain Southern

Notes and references 

1940 births
Living people
20th-century British painters
21st-century British painters
Alumni of the Royal College of Art
English contemporary artists
Alumni of Arts University Bournemouth